Euro Catch Festival was an annual professional wrestling event produced by Catch Wrestling Association (CWA) between 1991 and 1999. The event was hailed as the company's flagship event and the biggest event of the year. Two editions of the event were held once a year; the July event was held in Graz, Austria and the December event was held in Bremen, Germany. The 1999 edition of the event was the final CWA show as the promotion closed after that event. 

Rambo headlined all of the events with the exception of the July 1996 edition which was headlined by Ludvig Borga and August Smisl. All the events were headlined by a match for the promotion's top title, the prestigious CWA World Heavyweight Championship, with the exception of the 1999 event, which was headlined by a CWA World Middleweight Championship match between Franz Schumann and Jesus Cristobal, which would be the final match in CWA history.

Dates, venues and main events

Event history

1991

Euro Catch Festival (1991) was the first Euro Catch Festival professional wrestling event produced by Catch Wrestling Association (CWA). The event took place on December 21, 1991 at Stadthalle Bremen in Bremen, Germany. The event was a success as it drew a crowd of 10,000 people in a seating capacity of 3,500 people.
Show results

1992 (Graz)

Euro Catch Festival (1992) was the second edition of the Euro Catch Festival and marked the first time that the event was held twice a year. The first Euro Catch Festival of the year was held on July 11, 1992 at Eisstadion Liebenau in Graz, Austria and the second Euro Catch Festival was held on December 19, 1992 at Stadthalle Bremen in Bremen, Germany.
Show results

1992 (Bremen)

Show results

1993

Euro Catch Festival (1993) was the third Euro Catch Festival event which took place on December 18, 1993 at the Stadthalle Bremen in Bremen, Germany.
Show results

1994 (Graz)

Euro Catch Festival (1994) was held twice in 1994. The first event was held on July 9, 1994 at Eisstadion Liebenau in Graz, Austria and the second event was held on December 17, 1994 at Stadthalle Bremen in Bremen, Germany.
Show results

1994 (Bremen)

The Euro Catch Festival (1994) edition of Bremen was held on December 17, 1994 at the Stadthalle Bremen in Bremen, Germany.
Show results

1995 (Graz)

Euro Catch Festival (1995) was held on July 8, 1995 at the Eisstadion Liebenau in Graz, Austria.
Show results

1995 (Bremen)

Euro Catch Festival (1995) was a professional wrestling event held on December 16, 1995 at the Stadthalle Bremen in Bremen, Germany.
Show results

1996 (Graz)

Euro Catch Festival (1996) was a professional wrestling event that took place on July 6, 1996 at the Eisstadion Liebenau in Graz, Austria.
Show results

1996 (Bremen)

Euro Catch Festival (1996) was a professional wrestling event which took place on December 21, 1996 at the Marquee at the Bürgerweide in Bremen, Germany.
Show results

1997

Euro Catch Festival (1997) was the eleventh Euro Catch Festival event produced by Catch Wrestling Association. The event took place on July 5, 1997 at the Eisstadion Liebenau in Graz, Austria.
Show results

1998

Euro Catch Festival (1998) was the twelfth Euro Catch Festival professional wrestling event which took place on December 19, 1998 at the Stadthalle Bremen in Bremen, Germany.
Show results

1999

Euro Catch Festival (1999) was the thirteenth and final Euro Catch Festival professional wrestling event produced by Catch Wrestling Association and this was the final event of CWA as the promotion did not hold any more show after the event and closed. The event took place on December 4, 1999 at Marquee at the Bürgerweide in Bremen, Germany. This event marked the only time that the World Heavyweight Championship match did not headline the event but instead a World Middleweight Championship match between Franz Schumann and Jesus Cristobal was the main event of the show and final match of Catch Wrestling Association, which marked the only time that a World Middleweight Championship match headlined the prestigious Euro Catch Festival.
Show results

References

External links
Euro Catch Festival at Cagematch
Euro Catch Festival at Wrestlingdata

Catch Wrestling Association
Professional wrestling shows
Professional wrestling in Austria
Professional wrestling in Germany